Anatoliy Maksimovich Baranovsky (25 January 1906 – 9 November 1988) was a Ukrainian politician, economist and diplomat. He was Minister of Foreign Affairs of the Ukrainian SSR from 1952 to 1954 and Ministry of Finance of the Ukrainian SSR from 1961 to 1979.

Education 
Born in Kiev in 1906, Anatoliy Baranovsky graduated from Kharkiv Institute of Planning DerzhPlan in the Ukrainian SSR in 1933.

Professional career and experience 
In 1920–1930 he worked an employee of the tax office, the Komsomol and Soviet bodies Zhytomyr.

In 1933 he was a Senior Economist at the sector, department, deputy head of the State Planning Committee of the Ukrainian SSR.

In 1941 he was Deputy Chairman of People's Commissars of the Ukrainian SSR.

Since the beginning of the War in the offensive Nazi troops in Ukraine spends much work to evacuate important companies in the east to establish mass production of weapons and ammunition.

In 1941–1942 - Head of the Task Force on Industry Military Council of the Southern Front,

During 1942–1944 he worked expert Soviet Foreign Minister for Economic Affairs, participated in the preparation of economic articles (agreements) for an armistice with the Allies in Germany during World War II.

In the years 1944–1952 he was Deputy Chairman of The Council of Ministers of the Ukrainian SSR.

December 18, 1945 - he on behalf of the government of the Ukrainian SSR signed in Washington, D.C. an agreement on assistance to Ukraine international Organizations assistance to victims of war.

In March–May 1945 - Head of the Ukrainian delegation at the IV session of the organization. Participates in the Paris Peace Treaties, 1947.

Head of Delegation of the Ukrainian SSR at the Belgrade Conference of 1948, which developed the Convention on Navigation on the Danube River.

June 10, 1951 – May 10, 1954 – Minister of Foreign Affairs of the Ukrainian SSR

From 1950 to 1954 - headed the Ukrainian delegation to V-VIII sessions of the UN General Assembly.

In 1954–1957 – Chairman of the State Planning Commission, Deputy Chairman of the Council of Ministers of the Ukrainian SSR,

in 1957–1961 - first deputy chairman of the State Planning Commission - Minister of Ukraine.

In 1961–1979 he was Ministry of Finance of the Ukrainian SSR.

He died in Kiev on November 9, 1988 at the age of 82.

Diplomatic rank 
 Ambassador Extraordinary and Plenipotentiary

References

External links 
 The Ministry of Finance of Ukraine congratulates veterans of Great Patriotic War on occasion of 60-that Victory anniversary
 United Nations: The First Fifty Years. Stanley Meisler. Atlantic Monthly Press, 1995 - 386
 Diplomacy in the Former Soviet Republics James P. Nichol Greenwood Publishing Group, 1.01.1995 - 244.
 Soroka D. I. Historical retrospective of Ukraine's cooperation with the United Nations

1906 births
1988 deaths
Politicians from Kyiv
People from Kievsky Uyezd
Soviet foreign ministers of Ukraine
Diplomats from Kyiv
Permanent Representatives of Ukraine to the United Nations
Finance ministers of Ukraine
20th-century Ukrainian economists
Directors of the State Planning Committee of the Ukrainian Soviet Socialist Republic
Recipients of the Order of Lenin
Recipients of the Order of the Red Banner of Labour
Communist Party of Ukraine (Soviet Union) politicians
Politicians of the Ukrainian Soviet Socialist Republic
Second convocation members of the Verkhovna Rada of the Ukrainian Soviet Socialist Republic
Third convocation members of the Verkhovna Rada of the Ukrainian Soviet Socialist Republic
Fourth convocation members of the Verkhovna Rada of the Ukrainian Soviet Socialist Republic
Fifth convocation members of the Verkhovna Rada of the Ukrainian Soviet Socialist Republic
Sixth convocation members of the Verkhovna Rada of the Ukrainian Soviet Socialist Republic
Seventh convocation members of the Verkhovna Rada of the Ukrainian Soviet Socialist Republic
Eighth convocation members of the Verkhovna Rada of the Ukrainian Soviet Socialist Republic
Ninth convocation members of the Verkhovna Rada of the Ukrainian Soviet Socialist Republic
Burials at Baikove Cemetery
Soviet economists